Scincella punctatolineata, the Burma smooth skink, is a species of skink found in Myanmar and Thailand.

References

Scincella
Reptiles of Myanmar
Reptiles of Thailand
Reptiles described in 1893
Taxa named by George Albert Boulenger